"You'll Never Take That Away" is the debut single by New Zealand singer-songwriter Jamie McDell. It was released digitally as the lead single from her upcoming studio album on 20 February 2012.  "You'll Never Take That Away" was McDell's first single to top the Top 20 New Zealand Singles chart, and was certified Gold on 28 May 2012.

Background
"You'll Never Take That Away" was composed and written by McDell, and recorded at York Street Studio in Auckland. In an interview with New Zealand radio station, The Edge FM, McDell explained that the song is about enjoying life, happiness and not caring about what other people say or think about it.

Music video
The music video was released 4 March 2012 and features McDell at a beach location in New Zealand. She describes the video as "light and summery", serving as an introduction to her life and interests. The video focuses on McDell's love for the ocean and "showing what I get up to in the summertime".

Chart performance
"You'll Never Take That Away" was successful on the Official New Zealand Top 40, entering and debuting on the chart at No. 27 on 2 April 2012.  The single climbed to No. 11 and spent a total of ten weeks on the chart. The single also topped the Top 20 New Zealand Singles chart (which features singles by New Zealand artists) on 30 April 2012, holding the top position for four consecutive weeks. The single was certified Gold on 28 May 2012.

References

2012 songs
Jamie McDell songs